, officially translated into English as "Brand-new", is a song by Japanese rock band Kana-Boon. It was released as the band's fourteenth major-label single on June 12, 2019, through Ki/oon Music. "Massara" was used as the opening theme song for the anime series Sarazanmai, while its B-side track "FLYERS" was used as an image song for the smartphone game Kick-Flight.

Background
On March 7, 2019, the official website of Sarazanmai announced that Kana-Boon would be performing the opening theme song for the anime series. The song was written by Kana-Boon's singer and guitarist Maguro Taniguchi specifically for the show.

On writing the song, Taniguchi commented the song's main theme was "connections", specifically forging new connections and rekindling broken connections. The song was also written as part of the band's fifth anniversary of debuting under a major label.

On April 25, 2019, video game developer Grenge announced that the B-side track "FLYERS" would be used as an image song for a promotional video for its smartphone game Kick-Flight. The promotional video, animated by MAPPA, was released on June 5, 2019, with Taniguchi commenting that he was excited as the video looked like an anime opening, and he was looking forward to playing the game.

Release and reception
The single was released in two editions, a standard edition and a first pressing limited edition. The first pressing limited edition includes a DVD containing footage from Kana-Boon's fifth-anniversary tour .

The single reached number 25 on the Oricon charts, 68 on the Japan Hot 100, and 8 on the Japan Hot Animation charts.

Music video
The music video for "Massara" was released on June 12, 2019, and is directed by Satoshi Watanabe.

Track listing

Charts

Release history

References

External links
 

2019 singles
2019 songs
Kana-Boon songs
Anime songs
Ki/oon Music singles
Animated series theme songs